The 2014–15 PlusLiga was the 79th season of the Polish Volleyball Championship, the 15th season as a professional league organized by the Professional Volleyball League SA under the supervision of the Polish Volleyball Federation.

The number of teams competing in this season was increased from 12 to 14.

Asseco Resovia won their 7th title of the Polish Champions.

Regular season

|}

1st round

|}

2nd round

|}

3rd round

|}

4th round

|}

5th round

|}

6th round

|}

7th round

|}

8th round

|}

9th round

|}

10th round

|}

11th round

|}

12th round

|}

13th round

|}

14th round

|}

15th round

|}

16th round

|}

17th round

|}

18th round

|}

19th round

|}

20th round

|}

21st round

|}

22nd round

|}

23rd round

|}

24th round

|}

25th round

|}

26th round

|}

Playoffs

1st round
Quarterfinals: 1st–4th places
(to 2 victories)

|}

|}

|}

|}

5th–12th places

|}

|}

|}

2nd round
Semifinals: 1st–4th places
(to 3 victories)

|}

|}

Quarterfinals: 5th–12th places
(to 2 victories)

|}

|}

|}

|}

Semifinals: 5th–12th places
(to 2 victories)

|}

|}

|}

|}

3rd round
13th place
(to 2 victories)

|}

11th place
(to 2 victories)

|}

9th place
(to 2 victories)

|}

7th place
(to 2 victories)

|}

5th place
(to 2 victories)

|}

3rd place
(to 3 victories)

|}

Final
(to 3 victories)

|}

Final standings

Squads

See also
 2014–15 CEV Champions League
 2014–15 CEV Cup

References

External links
 Official website 

PlusLiga
Plusliga
Plusliga
Plusliga
Plusliga